HBTU (2-(1H-benzotriazol-1-yl)-1,1,3,3-tetramethyluronium hexafluorophosphate, Hexafluorophosphate Benzotriazole Tetramethyl Uronium) is a coupling reagent used in solid phase peptide synthesis. It was introduced in 1978 and shows resistance against racemization. It is used because of its mild activating properties.

The product obtained by reaction of HOBt with tetramethyl chloro uronium salt (TMUCl) was assigned to a uronium type structure, presumably by analogy with the corresponding phosphonium salts, which bear a positive carbon atom instead of the phosphonium residue. Later, it was shown by X-ray analysis that salts crystallize as aminium rather than the corresponding uronium salts.

Mechanism 

HBTU activates carboxylic acids by forming a stabilized HOBt (Hydroxybenzotriazole) leaving group. The activated intermediate species attacked by the amine during aminolysis is the HOBt ester.  

To create the HOBt ester, the carboxyl group of the acid attacks the imide carbonyl carbon of HBTU. Subsequently, the displaced anionic benzotriazole N-oxide attacks of the acid carbonyl, giving the tetramethyl urea byproduct and the activated ester. Aminolysis displaces the benzotriazole N-oxide to form the desired amide.

See also
 EDC
 HATU
 BOP reagent
 PyBOP
 PyAOP reagent

References

Hexafluorophosphates
Peptide coupling reagents
Benzotriazoles
Dimethylamino compounds